Lucky Ones is the third studio album by American country music artist Pat Green. His final album for Universal Records, it was released in 2004, and it produced three singles for him on the Billboard country charts: "Don't Break My Heart Again" (No. 21), "Somewhere Between Texas and Mexico" (No. 42) and "Baby Doll" (No. 21). "One Thing" was written by Jack Ingram, who previously recorded it on his 2002 album Electric.

Track listing

Personnel
 Pat Green - lead vocals, background vocals, acoustic guitar
 Brendon Anthony - mandolin, violin
 Kenny Aronoff - drums
 Mike Daly - Dobro, steel guitar
 Lisa Germano - violin
 David Grissom - acoustic guitar, electric guitar
 Billy Hawn - percussion, tambourine
 John Hobbs - piano, keyboards, Hammond organ
 Fred LeBlanc - background vocals
 Jordan McBride - electric guitar, mandolin
 David Neuhauser - piano, electric guitar, Hammond organ
 Brad Paisley - electric guitar and duet vocals on "College"
 Herb Pedersen - acoustic guitar, banjo, background vocals
 Justin Pollard - drums, tambourine
 Michael Tarabay - bass guitar
 Amanda Wilkinson - background vocals

Chart performance

Album

References

2004 albums
Albums produced by Don Gehman
Albums produced by Frank Rogers (record producer)
Pat Green albums
Show Dog-Universal Music albums